Brazos is an unincorporated community and census-designated place in Rio Arriba County, New Mexico, United States. Its population was 44 as of the 2010 census. U.S. Route 64 passes through the community.

See Los Brazos Historic District.

Geography

Demographics

Education
It is within the Chama Valley Independent Schools school district.

References

Census-designated places in New Mexico
Census-designated places in Rio Arriba County, New Mexico